Luís Filipe Hipólito Reis Pedrosa Campos (born 6 September 1964) is a Portuguese football executive and former manager who works as Football Advisor for Ligue 1 club Paris Saint-Germain.

Career
Campos began coaching in the lower leagues of Portugal at the age of 27 with Leiria, and managed several amateur teams and eventually professional teams in the Portuguese Primeira Liga. As manager of Gil Vicente, Campos ended José Mourinho's 27-game unbeaten streak with Porto. In 2012, Campos was a scout and tactical analyst for Real Madrid under Mourinho.

Campos made his name as sporting director at Monaco from 2013 to 2016. He oversaw the transfers of Radamel Falcao, João Moutinho, James Rodríguez, Fabinho, Anthony Martial, Ricardo Carvalho, Dimitar Berbatov, Bernardo Silva, Tiémoué Bakayoko, Geoffrey Kondogbia, and Thomas Lemar amongst others. He became the sporting director of Lille in 2017. On 18 December, 2020, Campos left Lille after a change of ownership at the club.

On 10 June 2022, Campos joined French champions Paris Saint-Germain (PSG) as Football Advisor. According to the club, the role of Football Advisor entails "focus on the performance, recruitment, and organisational side" of the team.

References

External links
 FDB Profile
 BDFutbol Profile

1964 births
Living people
People from Esposende
Portuguese football managers
S.C. Beira-Mar managers
Varzim S.C. managers
Vitória F.C. managers
Gil Vicente F.C. managers
F.C. Penafiel managers
C.D. Aves managers
U.D. Leiria managers
Primeira Liga managers
Real Madrid CF non-playing staff
AS Monaco FC non-playing staff
Lille OSC non-playing staff
Paris Saint-Germain F.C. non-playing staff
Sportspeople from Braga District